Barlborough Common is an area in Derbyshire, England. It is located to the south of Barlborough. The land has undergone extensive open-cast mining and subsequent restoration.

Geography of Derbyshire
Bolsover District